MS Combi Dock III is a semi-submersible heavy-lift ship, a specialized cargo vessel of Harren & Partner, Bremen. The vessel belongs to the Combi Dock Type and has a sister ship Combi Dock I, both vessels were built by Lloyd Werft Bremerhaven, Germany in 2008-2009 after the hulls had been completed by Christ S.A., Gdansk.

Combi Dock Type vessels have Lo-Lo / Ro-Ro / Flo-Flo (Lift on - Lift off / Roll on - Roll off / Float on - Float off) capabilities with a stern ramp. Combi Dock III is equipped with two cranes able to lift each 350 tons and one crane to lift 200 tons for a combined maximum lift of 700 tons. It has a cargo hold of 132 x 18 x 9.4 meters and can sail with an open hatch.

History
On 16 July 2013, during a storm, the Combi Dock III broke free of her moorings and damaged the submarine HMAS Sheean (SSG 77) at the Australian Marine Complex. Combi Dock III was impounded by the Australian government until 13 September, when the owners agreed to pay for the damage.

In July–August 2017, the Combi Dock III transported the sailing vessel Peking for repairs and permanent display from New York City to Germany.

Combi Dock series
Combi Dock III is the third ship of the Combi Dock series. Combi Dock II and IV have been converted into offshore support vessels and renamed.

References

2009 ships
Merchant ships of Antigua and Barbuda
Ships built in Germany
Heavy lift ships